The Woman Who Obeyed is a 1923 British silent film directed by Sidney Morgan and starring Stewart Rome, Hilda Bayley, and Peter Dear.

Premise
An overbearing husband separates his wife from her children but is reconciled to her after he has accidentally killed their son.

Cast
Hilda Bayley as Marion Dorchester
Stewart Rome as Dorchester
Henri de Vries as Captain Conway
Valia as Mrs. Bruce Carrington
Gerald Ames as Raymond Straithmore
Ivo Dawson as Duke of Rexford
Peter Dear as Bobbie Dorchester
Nancy Price as Governess

References

External links

 The Woman Who Obeyed at BFI Film & TV Database

1923 films
1923 drama films
British black-and-white films
British silent feature films
British drama films
1920s English-language films
1920s British films
Silent drama films